Aiguines is a rural commune in the Var department in the Provence-Alpes-Côte d'Azur region in Southeastern France.

It is located within the arrondissement of Brignoles, 18 km (11.1 mi) southwest of Castellane in neighbouring Alpes-de-Haute-Provence, the departmental border with which Aiguines is located on, following the flow of the Verdon River. In 2019, Aiguines had a population of 270.

Geography

Climate

Aiguines has a hot-summer Mediterranean climate (Köppen climate classification Csa) closely bordering on a humid subtropical climate (Cfa).

Demographics

See also
Communes of the Var department

References

External links

  Pictures of Aiguines
 Official website

Communes of Var (department)